Brymela is a genus of moss in family Pilotrichaceae. It contains the following species (but this list may be incomplete):
 Brymela tutezona, Crosby & B.H. Allen

References 

Moss genera
Hookeriales
Taxonomy articles created by Polbot